A list of Kannada language films produced in the Kannada film industry in India in 2015
 Films are generally released every Friday or Festival Day 
 In addition films can be released on specific festival days.

Film awards events
 62nd National Film Awards
 Karnataka State Film Awards 
 62nd Filmfare Awards South
 4th South Indian International Movie Awards
 Suvarna Film Awards, by Suvarna channel.
 Udaya Film Awards, by Udaya Channel
 Bangalore International Film Festival
 Bangalore Times Film Awards

Scheduled releases

January–June

July–December

Notable Deaths

References

External links
 Kannada Movies of 2015 at Internet Movie Database

Lists of 2015 films by country or language
2015
2015 in Indian cinema